Fort Juelson, designated 21OT198 in the state archaeological inventory, is a historic site located east of Underwood, Minnesota, United States. An earthen fort was built at this hilltop in July 1876 after rumors of Indian attacks in Foxhome, French, and Fergus Falls following the Battle of Little Bighorn in Montana. Many settlers left the area. Charles A. Dollner, a local merchant, suggested the rest of the people band together and build the fortification under leadership of two American Civil War veterans, Hans Juelson and Berge O. Lee. The scare proved to be a hoax, and the fort was never used for defensive purposes. Remnants of the sod barricade are still on the site. 

It was discovered that the fort was built on the site of a Woodland period burial mound group, which is also a part of this historic designation. It is made up of four small elliptical and linear burial mounds. The site was listed on the National Register of Historic Places in 2013.

References

External links

Otter Tail County Historical Society site

Mounds in Minnesota
Woodland period
Native American history of Minnesota
Protected areas of Otter Tail County, Minnesota
National Register of Historic Places in Otter Tail County, Minnesota
Archaeological sites on the National Register of Historic Places in Minnesota
Juelson